Challenge is a 2009 Indian Bengali action romance film directed by Raj Chakraborty. The film stars Dev and Subhashree Ganguly. For few scenes and music-videos, shooting was done in Dubai. The film is a remake of Telugu movie Dil (2003).

Plot
Abir joins college and comes across Pooja, the daughter of a ruthless businessman. Her father is strict and conservative in taking care of Pooja and does not tolerate if anyone, directly or indirectly, disturbs or approaches Pooja. Abir is bullied by a bunch of students and he pays them back in return by beating them all up. He also confronts her father's henchmen and makes them apologize when they misbehave with him before his fight with the students. Pooja is highly impressed on seeing this and she falls in love with him. He reciprocates and the two start dating. Pooja's father finds out about their relationship and opposes it. The rest of the story is how Abir and Pooja unite after a series of problems.

The films ends on a happy note.

Cast
 Dev as Abir
 Subhashree Ganguly as Pooja
 Rajatabha Dutta as Agnideb Sen, Pooja's dad, an industrialist and a local don
 Tulika Basu as Pooja's Mom
 Biswajit Chakraborty as Aabir's Dad
 Laboni Sarkar as Aabir's Mom
 Kharaj Mukherjee as Principal
 Parthosarathi Chakraborty as Gopal
 Supriyo Dutta as Karthik Da
 Prasun Gain as Poncha
 Pradip Dhar as Karthik's assistant
 Abhimanyu Mukherjee as Ranjan
 Tamal Roy Chowdhury as Pooja's maternal grandfather
 Debranjan Nag as Bhajahari

Sequel
Challenge 2 is a 2012 Indian Bengali action comedy film directed by Raja Chanda starring Dev and Pooja Bose. The film is a spiritual sequel to the 2009 Bengali film Challenge

Soundtrack 

Jeet Gannguli composed the music and lyrics were written by Priyo Chattopadhyay, Dipangshu Acharyaa, Abhimanyu Mukherjee, Nachiketa Chakraborty, Gautam Sushmit for Challenge.

References

External links
 

Bengali remakes of Telugu films
Bengali-language Indian films
2000s Bengali-language films
Films directed by Raj Chakraborty
Bengali action comedy films
Films scored by Jeet Ganguly